Mambetkulovo (Mämbätqol) is a rural locality (a village) in Leninsky Selsoviet, Kuyurgazinsky District, Bashkortostan, Russia. The population was 175 as of 2010. There are 3 streets.

Geography 
Mambetkulovo is located 35 km northeast of Yermolayevo (the district's administrative centre) by road. Pchelka is the nearest rural locality.

References 

Rural localities in Kuyurgazinsky District